The Faroe Islands lie on the Eurasian plate between Scotland, Norway and Iceland. The islands are of volcanic origin and are made up of three layers of basalt, with the top and bottom layers resembling each other. The age of this rock is between 54 and 58 million years, with the oldest material at the bottom.

The Faroe Islands were formed during a period of a few million years, some 55 million years ago in early Paleogene times, when Europe and Greenland started to separate, opening up what became the Northeast Atlantic Ocean. Countless volcanic eruptions built up a huge basalt plateau that covered almost the entire Faroe–Rockall region, together with the southeastern part of Greenland. In simple terms, each basalt lava flow of today's Faroe Islands represents one volcanic eruption during that time period.

Some volcanic eruptions produced voluminous sheet flows each with a thickness of several tens of meters and covering hundreds of square kilometres. Others built up compound lava flows each composed of several thin basalt layers. Some eruptions were violent and produced large volumes of volcanic ash that can be found in between the lava flows. Other strata between the basalt layers contain volcaniclastic and other sediments that indicate the long time intervals between eruptions, with rich vegetation taking root in a sub-tropic climate, and with local erosion or deposition of sediments in rivers and shallow lakes.
 
One volcanically silent time period was especially long and resulted in the deposition of several sedimentary layers of varied composition, including strata rich in organic material that subsequently have generated considerable volumes of coal. In recent times the coal has been worked from mines in between the basalt flows near the northern villages of Suðuroy.
 
Over the 54 million years since the last flows erupted, plate tectonics has slowly moved the Faroe Islands away from the active volcanic region, which today is concentrated in Iceland and along the Mid-Atlantic Ridge. Meanwhile, the majority of the Faroe–Rockall Plateau has subsided beneath sea level while erosive forces–especially during the last few million years of alternating glacial and interglacial periods–have sculpted the landscape into their present-day shape.
 

Notes

References

 Jørgensen, Gunni, and Jóannes Rasmussen. Geologisk Kort Over Færøerne Isbevægelser På Færøerne = Geological Map of the Faeoroe Islands, 1:122 000 : Ice Movements in the Faeroe Islands = Ísgongdin Í Føroyum. DGU series C, no. 7. København: Danmarks Geologiske Undersøgelse, 1988. 
 Peacock, Martin A. Recent Lines of Fracture in the Færoes in Relation to the Theories of Fiord Formation in Northern Basaltic Plateaux. Glasgow: Jackson, Wylie, 1928.
 Rasmussen, Jóannes, and Arne Noe-Nygaard. Geology of the Faeroe Islands (Pre-Quaternary). København: C.A. Reitzels Forlag, 1970. 

 

da:Færøernes geografi
de:Geologie und Geographie der Färöer
sv:Färöarnas geologi